Harry Smith served as the strength coach for the Tampa Bay Buccaneers of the National Football League from 1976 to 1979.

References

External links
May 12, 1976 article on Smith

Tampa Bay Buccaneers coaches
Possibly living people